Edward S. Jerse (born 1959) is an American politician who served as a member of the Ohio House of Representatives. In 2004, he ran for the Democratic nomination for Ohio's 14th congressional district, but lost to political novice Capri S. Cafaro.

Career 
Jerse, who has served as a member of Euclid, Ohio's city council, has served in the Ohio House from 1995 to 2005. and was the ranking minority member of the House Committee on Finance and Appropriations. Jerse served as Assistant Prosecutor with the City of Euclid from 2005 to 2006.

In the fall of 2005, Jerse served as campaign manager for the Reform Ohio Now ballot initiatives that tried to limit the role of the Ohio Secretary of State in elections. All initiatives were defeated at the polls. Jerse served as Director of Legislative Affairs for the Ohio Department of Development under Governor Ted Strickland. Jerse also served as the Director of Regional Collaboration for the Office of the Cuyahoga County Executive, Ed FitzGerald.

Education 
Jerse studied at John Carroll University before earning his bachelor's degree from Georgetown University and his J.D. degree from Harvard University.

References

External links
Ed Jerse for State Senate

1959 births
Living people
Case Western Reserve University faculty
People from Euclid, Ohio
Members of the Ohio House of Representatives
Harvard Law School alumni
21st-century American politicians
Georgetown University alumni